Live at the Royal Albert Hall is a concert recording by American singer-songwriter Beth Hart, recorded in the Royal Albert Hall on 4 May 2018,
 and released six months after her New York concert album on 30 November 2018 by Provogue in video format as Blu-ray, DVD and digital, and as a live music album on two CDs, three LPs, and as digital. Hart's performance, from belted out songs to intimate piano performance that reduced the 5000 seat venue to the feel of an intimate club, took the audience on a journey of many of her best songs and showcasing her journey through life. Hart dedicated the song "Close to My Fire" to her mother, who was one of the audience members of this concert. As well as putting on a musical tour-de-force, Hart opened up about her life and spun out intimate, off-the-cuff stories as she moved through her set.

Track listing
Live at Royal Albert Hall Show

Extras

Personnel

Musicians
 Beth Hart – vocals, piano, acoustic guitar, acoustic bass
 Jon Nichols – electric guitar, acoustic guitar, backing vocals
 Bill Ransom – drums, percussion
 Bob Marinelli – bass

Production
 Ed Van Zijl – executive producer
 David Wolff – executive producer
 Malcolm Walker – supervising producer
 Jeremy Azis – producer
 Nigel Dick – director
 Eugene O'Connor – director of photography
 Eddie Acket – editor
 Mike Wood – on-line editor
 James Thorn – assistant editor
 Jack Sowerby – engineer
 Mark Hornsby – recording engineer (RAH), audio edit, mixing
 Will Shapland – recording engineer (RAH)
 Nathan Heironimus – additional engineering
 Shawn Dealey – audio edit, mixing
 Ken Love – mastering (Sweetwater Studios in Fort Wayne, Indiana, US)
 Chris Goddard – audio engineer
 Mark Roundtree – audio assistant
 Lucas Uscila-Dainavicius – audio assistant
 Sebastian Nacca – mon sound engineer
 Jasoh Phair – foh sound engineer
 Roy Koch – artwork
 Willem Heijnen – artwork

Album

Track listing
CD 1

CD 2

Personnel

Musicians
 Beth Hart – vocals, piano, acoustic guitar, acoustic bass
 Jon Nichols – electric guitar, acoustic guitar, backing vocals
 Bill Ransom – drums, percussion
 Bob Marinelli – bass

Production
 Ed Van Zijl – executive producer
 David Wolff – executive producer
 Malcolm Walker – supervising producer
 Jeremy Azis – producer
 Mark Hornsby – recording engineer (RAH), audio edit, mixing
 Will Shapland – recording engineer (RAH)
 Shawn Dealey – audio edit, mixing
 Ken Love – mastering (Sweetwater Studios in Fort Wayne, Indiana, US)
 Chris Goddard – audio engineer
 Mark Roundtree – audio assistant
 Lucas Uscila-Dainavicius – audio assistant
 Sebastian Nacca – mon sound engineer
 Jasoh Phair – foh sound engineer
 Roy Koch – artwork
 Willem Heijnen – artwork

References

Live albums recorded at the Royal Albert Hall
Beth Hart albums
2018 live albums
2018 video albums
Live video albums